Victor Montell (25 September 1886 – 26 October 1967) was a Danish stage and film actor.

Selected filmography
Mælkemandens Hest - 1918 
Det store Mørke - 1917 
Panopta I - 1918 
Panopta II - 1918
Mælkemandens Hest - 1918
Kærlighed og Lotteri - 1919
Brændt a' - 1919 
Lykkens galoscher - 1921 
Film, flirt og forlovelse - 1921
Peter Ligeglad paa Eventyr - 1923 
Sommerspøg og Rævestreger - 1923
Daarskab, dyd og driverter - 1923
Stamherren - 1925 
Ebberöds bank - 1926
The Golden Smile - 1935
Prisoner Number One - 1935
Snehvide og de syv dværge - 1937
Alarm - 1938
Champagnegaloppen - 1938
Nordhavets mænd - 1939
Jeg har elsket og levet - 1940
Peter Andersen - 1941
Tror du jeg er født i går? - 1941
Ballade i Nyhavn - 1942
Natekspressen (P. 903) - 1942
Familien Gelinde - 1944
Fyrtøjet - 1946
Berlingske Tidende - 1949
Kampen mod uretten - 1949
For frihed og ret - 1949
Sønnen - 1953
Vores lille by - 1954
Kongeligt besøg - 1954
En fremmed banker på - 1959
Tro, håb og trolddom - 1960

External links

Biography at the Danish Film Institute (Danish)

Danish male film actors
Danish male silent film actors
20th-century Danish male actors
Danish male stage actors
Male actors from Copenhagen
1886 births
1967 deaths